Güeppi-Sekime National Park is a protected area located in the Peruvian region of Loreto, on the border with Ecuador. The park encompasses  of forests in a landscape that features hills and seasonally flooded lowlands.

History 
The Güeppi Reserved Zone was established in March 1997, initially covering . The name and the extension were modified and was granted a national park status in 2012.

Climate 

Ecology

Flora 

Among the plant species found in the area are: Socratea exorrhiza, Brownea grandiceps, Calyptranthes bipennis, Salvinia auriculata, Cedrela odorata, Phenakospermum guyannense, Mabea speciosa, Ilex inundata, Warszewiczia coccinea, Ocotea javitensis, Caryocar glabrum, Piper obliquum, Pourouma cecropiifolia, Handroanthus serratifolius, Genipa spruceana, Annona spp., Lecythis ampla, Ophiocaryon heterophyllum, Dieffenbachia parvifolia, Minquartia guianensis, Hymenachne donacifolia, Astrocaryum murumuru, Ficus schippii, Calathea spp., Cedrelinga cateniformis, Hevea guianensis, Trichomanes pinnatum, Miconia spp., Virola surinamensis, Mauritia flexuosa, Tapirira guianensis, etc.

Fauna 
There is a large diversity of birds and reptiles such as the black caiman (Melansosuchus niger). It is also home to several endangered species such as the jaguar (Panther onca) and the giant otter (Pteronura brasuliensis). This is also a site of the pink river dolphin (Inia geoffrensis), endangered by being used as bait in fishing for mota fish (Calophysus macropterus), despite such practices being illegal.

Birds found in the area include: the golden-green woodpecker, the sunbittern, the king vulture, the undulated tinamou, the green ibis, the harpy eagle, the white-necked jacobin, the white-throated toucan, the red-and-green macaw, the red-throated caracara, the muscovy duck, the agami heron, etc.

Anthropology 

Native peoples living within this region include the Quichua, the Secoya and the Bora.

References 

National parks of Peru
Geography of Loreto Region
Tourist attractions in Loreto Region